Sviatoslav Nikitenko (Nikitenko Sviatoslav Oleksiiovych; 15 April 1960 - Ukrainian glyptic artist.

Biography 
Nikitenko was born on 15 April 1960 in the city of Rostov-on-Don (USSR). In 1982 he graduated from Prydniprovska State Academy of Civil Engineering and Architecture in Dnipropetrovsk, architectural faculty. After graduation, he worked as an architect. At the same time, he started wooden miniatures carving. At the beginning of the 1990s, he began to carve cameos and intaglios.

Since 1994 he has participated in art exhibitions in Ukraine and abroad.
In 2000, he joined the National Artists' Union of Ukraine. As of 2012, he has completed more than 460 gems.

Works 

The works are presented by cameos and intaglios. First cameos of Nikitenko were carved of bone, then the artist started to process gemstones.
The main raw materials are citrine, topaz, carnelian, morion and other hard gemstones. In the middle of the 1990s Nikitenko started working on restoring of the traditions of the Christian glyptic, 
which was developed in Byzantine Empire and was also spread in Kievan Rus'. 
Some works of Nikitenko are devoted to the subjects of the Classical antiquity art, besides are presented by portraits
The works are in own of Church and in private collections of many countries

Footnotes

References 

 40 names. The world of art of Dnipropetrovsk (40 imyon. Mir iskusstva Dnepropetrovska). 2003. Dnipropetrovsk, 84 p.
 Baranov, P.M. 1999. Stone carver Sviatoslav Nikitenko (Khudozhnyk-rizbiar po kameniu Sviatoslav Nikitenko) // Precious and decorative stones (Koshtovne ta dekoratyvne kaminnia). #4, p. 21-22.
 Kazdym, A. 2011. Painting in stone (Zhyvopis v kamne) // Jewellery review (Yuvelirnoye obozreniye). October, p. 32-33.
 Nikitenko, I. 2004. The revival of the old tradition (Vozrozhdenie drevnyey tradicii) // Bulletin of Ukrainian Jeweller (Visnyk yuvelira Ukrainy), #3, p. 38-40.
 Sapfirova, N. 2012. Stone in Modern Jewellery and Stone Carving Art. Artists of Ukraine. (Kamen v sovremennom yuvelirnom i kamnereznomiskusstve. Mastera Ukrainy) // Ukrainian Geologist Journal (Geolog Ukrainy). #3, p. 164-168
 The artists of Dnipropetrovsk region (Khudozhnyky Dnipropetrovshchyny). 2004. - Dnipropetrovsk, 384 p. - .

External links 
 Official site
 Sviatoslav Nikitenko | National Artists' Union of Ukraine 
 GLYPTOGRAPHY: AN ANCIENT ART REBORN IN MODERN TIMES
 J-Izvestia (Jewellery News)
 Shazina Gallery

Ukrainian artists
1960 births
Living people